Michael Krmenčík (born 15 March 1993) is a Czech professional footballer who plays as a forward for Persija Jakarta and the Czech Republic national team.

Club career

Krmenčík was born in Kraslice, Czech Republic, on March 15, 1993. He began his football career at the academies of his home town, and then moved to Banik Sokolov. The scouts at Viktoria Plzen were alerted to his talent, and moved quickly to sign him, initially for the club’s development squad.

Early career
In 2011 he was promoted to the first team and in April of the same year he made his debut in a game against 1. FK Příbram. In the 2011-12 season, he was loaned out to Banik Sokolov, where he scored his first professional goal.

In the following four seasons, he went on loan spells at Zenit Čáslav, Vlašim, Baník Ostrava and Dukla Prague in the Czech leagues. He returned to Viktoria Plzeň in the second half of the 2015-16 season and his career began to gain momentum.

In nine games he scored three times, winning a place in the team’s starting XI. The opportunity he had been waiting for so long for came, and he made sure to take full advantage of it.

Viktoria Plzeň
By January 2020, Krmenčík managed to impress many playing for Viktoria Plzeň. In 124 matches, he scored 62 goals, made 16 assists and won four trophies. He was also the league's top scorer in the 2017-18 season.

A ligament rupture in the 2018-19 season kept him out of action for a long time, but he remained impressive when he returned. His displays convinced Club Brugge of his potential.

Club Brugge
In January 2020, Club Brugge spent €6 million to make Krmenčík their own. He signed a three-and-a-half year contract with the Belgian club. However, the adjustment was difficult for the Czech forward, who scored just three times in 19 games but also contributing to three assists.

Loan to PAOK
On 5 January 2021, PAOK announced that they reached an agreement with Club Brugge for the loan of Krmenčík until the end of the 2020–21 season. On 22 May 2021, Krmenčík scored in the last minute of Greek Cup Final, sealing a 2–1 win against league champions Olympiacos.

Loan to Slavia Prague
On 23 July 2021, Slavia Prague announced that Krmenčík would be joining the club on a season-long loan with an obligation to make the transfer permanent if Slavia qualified for the group stage of the UEFA Champions League.

Persija Jakarta
In June 2022, Krmenčík joined Indonesian Liga 1 side Persija Jakarta. On 23 July 2022, He made his league debut by starting in a 0–1 loss against Bali United.

International career
He has been a full Czech Republic international since 2016 and counts 26 appearances to his name, as well as nine goals. Previously, he also represented his country at many youth levels.

Career statistics

Club

International
Scores and results list the Czech Republic's goal tally first, score column indicates score after each Krmenčík goal.

Honours
Viktoria Plzeň
Czech First League: 2010–11, 2015–16, 2017–18

Club Brugge
Belgian First Division A: 2019–20

PAOK
Greek Cup: 2020–21

Individual
Czech First League Top Scorer: 2017–18
Greek Cup top scorer: 2020–21

References

External links
 
 

Living people
1993 births
People from Kraslice
Association football forwards
Czech footballers
Czech Republic youth international footballers
Czech Republic under-21 international footballers
Czech Republic international footballers
FC Viktoria Plzeň players
FK Baník Sokolov players
FK Čáslav players
FC Sellier & Bellot Vlašim players
FC Baník Ostrava players
FK Dukla Prague players
Club Brugge KV players
PAOK FC players
Czech First League players
Czech National Football League players
Belgian Pro League players
Super League Greece players
UEFA Euro 2020 players
Czech expatriate footballers
Czech expatriate sportspeople in Belgium
Expatriate footballers in Belgium
Czech expatriate sportspeople in Greece
Expatriate footballers in Greece
SK Slavia Prague players
Sportspeople from the Karlovy Vary Region
Liga 1 (Indonesia) players
Persija Jakarta players
Expatriate footballers in Indonesia
Czech expatriate sportspeople in Indonesia